Metsiku is a village in Haljala Parish, Lääne-Viru County, in northern Estonia.

The village sprang up on the territory of Metsiku Manor, part of Haljala Parish (Kirchspiel Haljall). At first it bore the name of Koduvere (Koddofer), but after the disestablishing of the manor the village was called Metsiku.

In 1872 Danel Pruhl established the first library targeted Estonian peasants.

References

 

Villages in Lääne-Viru County